Natkhat is a 2020 Indian short film directed by Shaan Vyas and written by Vyas and Annukampa Harsh. It stars Vidya Balan as a mother educating her young son about gender equality. It premiered on YouTube as part of the We Are One: A Global Film Festival.

The film will be opening film of the Indian Film Festival of Melbourne on October 23. The 2020 festival is being hosted virtually between October 23 and 30, due to the cloud of the COVID-19 pandemic.

Cast
Vidya Balan as Surekha ; Sonu's mother
Sanika Patel as Sonu
Raj Arjun as Sonu's father
Atul Tiwari as Sonu's grandfather
Nivedita Baunthiyal
Sparsh Shrivastava as Sonu's uncle
Samarth Mahor As Bantu
Aruraj patel as Bhusa
Abhi Dubey as Suresh
Vedant Tanwar as Dora

Production
Natkhat was filmed in Harda, Madhya Pradesh, and the interior scenes were filmed in Mumbai. A majority of the cast members had no prior acting experience. Sanika Patel, a girl, was cast in the leading role of Sonu.

Reception
Shubhra Gupta of The Indian Express labelled Natkhat a "valuable addition to the films which call out patriarchy, and how utterly damaging it can be." Jyoti Sharma Bawa of Hindustan Times credited Vyas for effectively portraying a world in which "women are shorn of agency and men get their power from displaying naked machismo"; she praised Vidya for bringing "simplicity and nuance" to her role and Patel for matching her vulnerability.

References

External links
 
 The Brat at We Are One: A Global Film Festival

2020 films
2020 drama films
2020 short films
Indian short films
Indian drama films
2020s Hindi-language films
Hindi-language drama films